Jeffrey Skidmore OBE (born 27 February 1951) is the conductor and artistic director of Ex Cathedra, a choir and early music ensemble based in Birmingham in the West Midlands, England. An active participant in musical education and a pioneer in researching and performing neglected choral works of the 16th to 18th centuries, he has worked with leading musicologists to prepare new performing editions of French and Italian music. In particular, his recordings of French and Latin American Baroque music with Ex Cathedra have won wide acclaim.

Early life and education

Jeffrey Skidmore was born in Birmingham, England, in 1951. He also attended St. Heliers Road Sunday School in Northfield before 1962, when he went to Bournville Boys Technical School, later Bournville Grammar-Technical School for Boys.

Ex Cathedra
Skidmore began conducting while still at school, and was only 18 years old when he founded the Ex Cathedra choir in Birmingham in 1969. After going to Bournville Boys Technical School, later Bournville Grammar-Technical School for Boys, he went on to read music with David Wulstan at Magdalen College, Oxford, where he was a choral scholar under Bernard Rose. He then taught as a music school teacher in Birmingham, including at John Willmott School in Sutton Coldfield.

Directing the Ex Cathedra choir and its associated Ex Cathedra Consort and Baroque Orchestra, Skidmore has appeared in concert series and festivals across the UK and abroad, and has made a number of highly acclaimed recordings. In addition, he regularly conducts other ensembles such as the BBC Singers, the City of Birmingham Symphony Orchestra and the Hanover Band. He has commissioned over thirty new works and conducted many world premières by well-established and new composers, including Sally Beamish, Fyfe Hutchins, Gabriel Jackson, John Joubert, James MacMillan, Alec Roth, Daryl Runswick, Peter Sculthorpe, Philip Sheppard, Peter Wiegold and Roderick Williams.

In the field of opera Skidmore worked with Marc Minkowski and David McVicar on the 2004 production of Eccles' Semele at the Théâtre des Champs-Élysées in Paris; and conducted Cavalli's La Calisto, Purcell's Dido and Aeneas, and Rameau's Pigmalion at the Royal Birmingham Conservatoire. With Ex Cathedra he gave the first performances in modern times of the French Baroque operas Zaïde, reine de Grenade (Zaïde, Queen of Grenada) by Royer and Isis by Lully.

Skidmore was appointed Officer of the Order of the British Empire (OBE) in the 2015 New Year Honours for services to choral music.

Contributions to musicology and musical education
Skidmore is a pioneer in the field of research and performance of neglected choral works of the 16th to 18th centuries, and, in particular, has won wide acclaim for his recordings of French and Latin American Baroque music with Ex Cathedra for Hyperion Records. A lecturer and honorary fellow at Royal Birmingham Conservatoire and a research fellow at the University of Birmingham, he has worked with many leading musicologists to prepare new performing editions of French, Italian and Spanish music by Giovanni Animuccia, Juan de Araujo, Marc-Antoine Charpentier, Michel Richard Delalande, Claudio Monteverdi and Jean-Philippe Rameau.

Active in music education, Skidmore is Artistic Director of Early Music at Royal Birmingham Conservatoire, and director of Ex Cathedra's wide-reaching education programme. He frequently gives choral training workshops and teaches at summer schools in the UK and overseas. He has regularly directed the choral programme at Dartington International Summer School and was Classical Music Programmer for the 2005 Kilkenny Arts Festival.

See also
Ex Cathedra

Notes

References

.
.
Programme for Ex Cathedra's performance of John Joubert's Wings of Faith at The Oratory, Birmingham, on 22 March 2007.

Further reading

.
.
.
.
.
.
.
.
.

External links
Jeffrey Skidmore at the website of Ex Cathedra
Jeffrey Skidmore at the Bach Cantatas website
Jeffrey Skidmore at the Hyperion Records website
Jeffrey Skidmore at the website of the Lacock Summer School, which conducts courses for singers and players of Renaissance and Baroque instruments 

Jeffrey Skidmore at the website of Mayler Artist Management 

English choral conductors
British male conductors (music)
British performers of early music
Founders of early music ensembles
English musicologists
Musicians from Birmingham, West Midlands
Academics of Birmingham City University
Academics of the University of Birmingham
Alumni of Magdalen College, Oxford
1951 births
Living people
Officers of the Order of the British Empire
21st-century British conductors (music)
21st-century British male musicians